Powers is a given name or surname.

People with the given name
 Powers Boothe (1948–2017), American actor
 Powers Hapgood (1899–1949), American trade union organizer and Socialist Party leader

People with the surname
 Abigail Fillmore (née Abigail Powers, 1798–1853), First Lady of the United States
 Abra J. Powers (1883-1971), American lawyer and politician
 Albert E. Powers (1816–1910), American President of Rensselaer Polytechnic Institute
 Ann Powers (born 1964), American writer and pop music critic
 Caleb Powers (1869–1932), US Representative from Kentucky
 Chet Powers (Chester William Powers Jr., 1937–1994), American singer-songwriter
 Claudia Powers (born 1950), American politician
 D. Lane Powers (1896–1968), US Representative from New Jersey
 Darrell Powers ("Shifty" Powers, 1923–2009), American WWII veteran portrayed in Band of Brothers
 Dave Powers (1932–2008), American television director and producer
 David Powers (1912–1998), Special Assistant to John F. Kennedy
 David J. Powers (1814–1909), American businessman, co-founder of Whitewater, Wisconsin, and Palmyra, Wisconsin
 Doc Powers (Michael Riley Powers, 1870–1909) an American Major League Baseball player
 Georgia Davis Powers (1923–2016), Kentucky politician
 Gershom Powers (1789–1831), US Representative from New York
 Francis Gary Powers (1929–1977), American pilot who was shot down over the Soviet Union in 1960
 Hardy Powers (1900–1972), general superintendent in the Church of the Nazarene
 Harold Powers (1928–2007), American musicologist, ethnomusicologist, and music theorist
 Harold J. Powers (1900–1996), Lieutenant Governor of California
 Harriet Powers (1837–1910), African American slave, folk artist and noted quilt maker
 Hiram Powers (1805–1873), American neoclassical sculptor
 Horace Henry Powers (1835–1913), US Representative from Vermont
 J. F. Powers (1917–1999), American short story and novel writer
 Jack Powers (1827–1860), Irish-American gambler and gang leader
 James Powers (New York politician) (1785–1868), New York politician
 James F. Powers (1938–2012), New Hampshire politician
 Jessica Powers (1905–1988), American poet and Carmelite nun
 Jerraud Powers American football player
 Jim Powers (born 1958), American retired professional wrestler
 Joey Powers (1934–2017), American singer-songwriter
 John Powers (American football coach), college football co-head coach
 John Powers (baseball) (1929–2001), baseball outfielder
 John Powers (mayor), American politician, Mayor of Spokane, WA
 John A. Powers (1922–1979), public affairs officer for NASA
 John E. Powers (1910–1998), Massachusetts politician
 John Holbrook Powers (1831–1918), Nebraska pioneer
 John J. Powers (food scientist) (born 1918), Food Science
 John James Powers (1912–1942), United States Navy officer and Medal of Honor recipient
 John R. Powers (born 1945), American novelist and playwright
 John Robert Powers (1892–1977), American actor and owner of a modelling agency.
 John T. Powers, President of the Federal League of baseball
 Johnny Powers (born 1943), originally named Dennis Waters, a Canadian professional wrestler
 Keith T. Powers (born 1992), American actor and model
 Kemp Powers, American playwright, screenwriter, and director
 Kevin Powers (born 1980), American writer and Iraq War veteran
 Kimberly Powers, American epidemiologist
 Kirsten Powers (born 1969), American columnist, blogger, pundit and political commentator
 Lauren Powers (born 1961), American actress, amateur bodybuilder and firefighter
 Leo J. Powers (1909–1967), US Army soldier and a recipient of the Medal of Honor
 Levi P. Powers (1828-1888), Wisconsin legislator and judge
 Lewis J. Powers (1837–1915), Massachusetts businessman and politician
 Llewellyn Powers (1836–1908), Governor of Maine, US Representative from Maine
 Mala Powers (1931–2007), American film actress and television guest actress
 Megan Powers, Trump campaign worker, former NASA press secretary
 Mike Powers (disambiguation)
 Millard Powers (born 1965), American musician, songwriter, record producer and recording engineer
 Millard Powers Fillmore (1828–1889), son of US President Millard Fillmore
 Oswald A. Powers (1915–1942), US Navy officer and Navy Cross recipient
 PJ Powers (born 1960), a South African singer also known as Penelope Jane Dunlop and as Thandeka
 Pat Powers (businessman) (1870–1948), Irish-American businessman
 Patrick Powers (volleyball) (born 1958), American volleyball player
 Patrick T. Powers (1860–1925), American minor league baseball executive
 Preston Powers (1842–1904), American sculptor
 Ralph Ernest Powers (1875–1952), American mathematician
 Richard Powers (born 1957), American novelist
 Richie Powers (1930–1998), American professional basketball referee
 Ridgley C. Powers (1836–1912), Governor of Mississippi
 Ron Powers (born 1941), American journalist, novelist, and non-fiction writer
 Samuel L. Powers (1848–1929), US Representative from Massachusetts
 Stefanie Powers (born 1942), American actress and singer
 Stephen Powers (1840–1904), American journalist, ethnographer, and historian of Native American tribes in California
 Thomas Powers (born 1940), American author, intelligence expert, and recipient of the Pulitzer Prize
 Tim Powers (born 1952), American science fiction and fantasy author
 Tom Powers (1890–1957), American stage and film actor
 Victoria Powers, American mathematician
 Warren Powers (1941–2021), American football coach
 Warren Powers (American football) (born 1965), American football player
 William Powers (politician), Chairman of the New York Republican State Committee
 William C. Powers (1946–2019) the 28th president of The University of Texas at Austin
 William T. Powers (1926–2013), scholar of psychology theory
 William T. Powers (industrialist) (1820–1907), manufacturer and capitalist

Fictional characters with the surname
 Austin Powers, fictional British spy portrayed by Mike Myers
 Douglas Powers, also known as Dr. Evil, Austin Powers' nemesis and secret twin brother
 Nigel Powers, the father of Austin and Douglas
 Kitty Powers, the drag queen persona of game developer Rich Franke and the titular character of Kitty Powers' Matchmaker

See also
 Power (name)
 Powers (disambiguation)